Robb Stark is a fictional character in the A Song of Ice and Fire series of epic fantasy novels by American author George R. R. Martin, and its television adaptation Game of Thrones, where he is portrayed by Scottish actor Richard Madden. 

Introduced in A Game of Thrones (1996), Robb is the eldest son and heir of Lord Eddard Stark of Winterfell and Eddard's wife Lady Catelyn Stark. He subsequently appeared in Martin's A Clash of Kings (1998) and A Storm of Swords (2000). After his father is executed by king Joffrey Baratheon in King's Landing, Robb assembles his Northern bannermen, is crowned 'King in the North', and marches south to seek vengeance against the Lannisters and independence for his new kingdom. The plot in the third novel and third season involving Robb and his Northern army at the House Frey wedding of his uncle Edmure Tully shocked both readers of the book and viewers of the TV series.

Character description 
Robb is 14 years old at the beginning of A Game of Thrones (17 on the TV series). He is the oldest legitimate son of Eddard "Ned" Stark and his wife Catelyn, and has five siblings: younger sisters Sansa and Arya, younger brothers Bran and Rickon, and a bastard half-brother Jon Snow. He is also a close friend to Eddard's ward Theon Greyjoy.  Robb is constantly accompanied by his direwolf, Grey Wind.  Like most of his siblings, Robb inherited his mother's Tully features, being strong and fast with a stocky build, blue eyes and thick red-brown hair.

As Eddard's heir, Robb remains at Winterfell and rules in his father's stead when Eddard goes to King's Landing to become King Robert Baratheon's King's Hand.  After King Robert's death, Eddard is imprisoned in political struggle with Queen Cersei.  Robb calls his banners and raises a Northern army to aid his maternal House Tully against the invading Lannister army, and scores a crushing victory at Whispering Wood, capturing Jaime Lannister.  After his father is publicly beheaded under King Joffrey Baratheon's order, Robb is crowned King in the North by his bannermen, and declares the North and the Riverlands an independent kingdom, officially starting the War of the Five Kings.  Despite displaying an exceptional proficiency in military talent, Robb is ultimately betrayed and murdered at the wedding of his uncle Edmure with Roslin Frey, by the treacherous Walder Frey and Roose Bolton, all under discreet command of Tywin Lannister.

Development, overview and reception
James Poniewozik of Time describes Robb as less eager to seek retaliation than his father Eddard but as more pragmatic.  Poniewozik's overview of the television version of Robb focuses on his role as a foil for Eddard:

Robb has risen to take his father’s place, as a lord of Winterfell and as a focal character in the show. We never saw what kind of warrior Ned was in the field, but in King’s Landing, he fought a straight-ahead battle, telegraphing his moves, and died for it. Robb, seeing the Lannisters' numbers, shows himself capable of feints and deceptions—albeit at the cost of 2,000 men and the guilt of having sent them on a suicide mission.

In the third novel, A Storm of Swords, Robb is assassinated in an event called the Red Wedding, which was inspired by the Black Dinner and Glencoe Massacre from Scottish history.  George Martin has said that he decided to kill Robb Stark because he wished to keep the story difficult to predict: "I killed Ned because everybody thinks he’s the hero ... The next predictable thing is to think his eldest son is going to rise up and avenge his father. And everybody is going to expect that. So immediately [killing Robb] became the next thing I had to do."

In their 2015 book, Game of Thrones and Business, Tim Phillips and Rebecca Claire agree: 

The Scottish actor Richard Madden has received positive reviews for his role as Robb Stark in the TV series.

Storylines

Novels 
Robb Stark is not a point of view character in the novels and is mostly a background character. His actions are mainly witnessed and interpreted through the eyes of his brother Bran and mother Catelyn, as well as via memories of Jon Snow and Theon Greyjoy.

A Game of Thrones 
When his father departs for King's Landing to act as Hand of the King for Robert Baratheon, Robb becomes acting Lord of Winterfell. Following his father's arrest for presumed treason, he marches south with an assembled army in attempt to free his father. To secure safe passage at the vital crossing of The Twins, Robb consents to marrying one of Lord Walder Frey's daughters or granddaughters as negotiated by his mother. After crossing the river, he surprises and destroys the Lannister army besieging Riverrun, capturing Ser Jaime Lannister in the process. Upon hearing of his father's execution at King's Landing on the orders of King Joffrey Baratheon, Robb is crowned the King in the North and King of the Trident by his bannermen.

A Clash of Kings 
Robb continues to win victories against Lord Tywin Lannister's armies, and earns the nickname "Young Wolf" for his ferocity in battle. He sends his mother to negotiate an alliance with King Renly Baratheon, but Renly is assassinated by his brother, King Stannis Baratheon with blood magic from the priestess Melisandre. Robb invades The Westerlands in order to strategically assist Stannis' campaign against the Lannisters. He also sends Lord Theon Greyjoy to Pyke to broker an alliance with Theon's father Balon Greyjoy, Lord of the Iron Islands. However, Balon declares himself to be a King and decides to invade the North instead. Theon joins his father, seizing Winterfell by surprise. Theon is believed to have murdered Robb's youngest siblings Bran and Rickon, though in reality they have escaped and gone into hiding.

A Storm of Swords 
During an assault in the Westerlands, Robb is wounded and learns of the apparent deaths of his brothers at the hands of his closest friend and ally. Falling ill due to mourning and injury, he falls in love with the noble maiden in charge of nursing him, Lady Jeyne Westerling, and takes her virginity. To preserve Jeyne's honor, Robb marries her, rescinding his previous marriage arrangement with House Frey, causing them to desert his army.

Following Stannis' defeat at the Battle of the Blackwater, Robb withdraws from the Westerlands and returns to Riverrun to attend the funeral of his grandfather Lord Hoster Tully. Upon returning, Robb learns that his mother has secretly released Jaime Lannister as an exchange for her daughter Sansa, a hostage in King's Landing. This leads to the mutiny of Lord Rickard Karstark, whose two sons were slain by Jaime, forcing Robb to execute Rickard and lose the Karstark's support. With his army dwindling, Robb tries to repair the alliance with the Freys by bargaining his uncle Lord Edmure Tully to marry Lady Roslin Frey. The Freys demand that Robb personally attend the wedding at The Twins as an apology.

Robb learns that Balon Greyjoy has died and he decides to lead his army to retake the North immediately after the wedding is complete. He soon learns that his sister Sansa has been forcibly married to Lord Tyrion Lannister. To prevent the Lannisters from claiming Winterfell through Sansa's child by Tyrion, Robb, against the opposition of his mother, disinherits Sansa and signs a decree legitimizing his bastard half-brother Jon Snow as his heir if he happens to die with no children, and requests the Night's Watch release Jon from service. Robb then entrusts the decree to Lord Galbart Glover and Lady Maege Mormont, sending them to make contact with Lord Howland Reed so that he can launch a coordinated attack to recapture the strategically crucial Moat Cailin.

At The Twins, the Northern convoy, who are treated with bread and salt (thus promised guest rights and safety), are betrayed and massacred by House Frey and House Bolton during the wedding feast in an event known as the "Red Wedding". Robb is shot by crossbow bolts multiple times, and then personally murdered by his chief vassal Lord Roose Bolton, who has secretly defected to the Lannisters in reward for being named the Warden of the North. After his death, the Freys mutilate Robb's body by sewing the head of his dead direwolf Grey Wind onto his decapitated corpse. His mother, as well as his entire northern army (save for the Boltons and Freys), are also murdered.

TV adaptation 

Robb Stark is portrayed by Richard Madden in the television adaption of the series. There are some slight differences between Robb's TV portrayal and the book version. Due to the child characters' ages being increased, Robb's age is changed from fourteen to seventeen-years-old at the start of the series. Instead of marrying Jeyne Westering, he marries a healer from Volantis named Talisa Maegyr, who is also killed during "The Red Wedding". And while Robb is a background character in the books, not having any chapters told from his perspective, he is listed ahead of Michelle Fairley, who plays POV character Catelyn Stark in the books, in the opening credits of many episodes, and we see the Stark's storyline in seasons two and three revolve more around Robb in the viewers' eyes as opposed to the readers'.

James Poniewozik comments in TIME, on Madden's performance in "The Pointy End": "both the script and Richard Madden show in deft, quick strokes how the crisis focuses him. (This is another case where having a live actor does a better job of showing a transition that seemed more abrupt in the book.)"

Madden said that he learned that the character would be killed off early on but otherwise read the books season by season, focusing primarily on the scripts: "I'm, as an actor, forced to bend the path I put Robb on and change it and keep the surprises coming. Hopefully, I managed to do that."

Season 1 
Robb Stark is the eldest son of Lord Eddard Stark and Lady Catelyn. When King Robert Baratheon summons Eddard to King's Landing to serve as Hand of the King, Robb becomes acting Lord of Winterfell. After his father is arrested for apparent treason, Robb summons the Northern bannermen and assembles an army of 20,000 in an effort to rescue his father and aid the Riverlands, which have come under attack by the armies of House Lannister. Catelyn brokers an alliance between the North and House Frey when Robb consents to marrying one of Lord Walder Frey's daughters, allowing the Stark army to strategically cross the river at the Twins and launch a surprise engagement against the Lannisters, successfully capturing Ser Jaime Lannister in the process. After the death of Robert Baratheon and the execution of Eddard Stark on the orders of King Joffrey Baratheon, a bastard born of incest between Jaime and Cersei Lannister, the Northern and Riverland Lords declare their independence from the Iron Throne and proclaim Robb as "The King in the North".

Season 2 
Robb proves to be a skillful military commander and he wins a succession of battles against Lord Tywin Lannister's forces, earning him the nickname "the Young Wolf". He sends his closest friend, Lord Theon Greyjoy, to the Iron Islands to broker an alliance with Lord Balon Greyjoy, Theon's father. In exchange for Greyjoy support and the use of their naval fleet, Robb intends to recognize the Iron Islands' independence. Robb also sends his mother to parlay with Renly Baratheon, who has declared himself king and has amassed an army of 100,000. However, Lord Stannis Baratheon, having also declared himself king via the lawful line of succession, prepares to engage Renly. Catelyn is successful in brokering an alliance with Renly, but he is assassinated by Stannis' using blood magic. Theon fails to convince his father to ally with Robb, and Balon launches an invasion of the North. Theon decides to capture Winterfell to earn his father's favor. Robb offers amnesty to the Ironborn invaders on the condition that they hand over Theon. Robb soon meets and falls in love with Talisa Maegyr, a foreign healer from Volantis. 

Stannis assaults King's Landing at the Battle of Blackwater Bay and is defeated when Tywin, joined by the armies of House Tyrell via a newly brokered alliance, arrives and stops the city from being sacked.  While Robb travels to the Crag to negotiate a surrender, Jaime escapes and kills the son of Lord Rickard Karstark before he is recaptured. Catelyn stops Rickard from killing Jaime but discontent within the Stark army begins to grow. Additionally, despite his mother's protest, Robb breaks his engagement with the Freys and marries Talisa. As a result, the Freys abandon the Stark army.

Season 3 
Believing Jaime to be her only chance of seeing her daughters again, Catelyn frees him and commands Brienne of Tarth to bring him to King's Landing in exchange for Sansa. Furious, Robb has his mother imprisoned. He leads his army to capture Harrenhal, but finds that hundreds of his imprisoned bannermen have been slaughtered. Upon learning of the death of his grandfather, Lord Hoster Tully, Robb returns to Riverrun for the funeral. Robb's uncle and the new Lord of Riverrun, Edmure Tully, is scolded by Robb for previously disobeying a command when he attacked Ser Gregor Clegane's forces. While at Riverrun, Robb executes Rickard Karstark after he murders two teenage Lannister squires. As a result, the Karstarks abandon his army. In order to regain an alliance with the Freys and bolster his army, Robb arranges for the reluctant Edmure to marry one of Walder Frey's daughters. With the advisement of his mother, Robb prepares to invade Casterly Rock, the domain of House Lannister.  

At the Twins, Walder Frey provides guest right to Robb, his family and bannermen. The wedding commences but Walder betrays Robb in an event secretly orchestrated by Tywin, Walder, and Lord Roose Bolton. Talisa, pregnant with Robb's child, is stabbed in the stomach and killed. Robb's entire army (save for the Boltons and Freys), are murdered. Robb himself is shot with multiple crossbow bolts, taunted by Walder, and subsequently executed by Roose with a knife to the heart. Catelyn kills Walder's wife but she too is executed when her throat is slit. Robb's corpse is decapitated and his direwolf Grey Wind's head is sewn on in its place, and the corpse is then paraded around as the Stark forces are slaughtered. Robb's great-uncle, Ser Brynden Tully escapes, but Edmure is held captive and Walder becomes Lord of Riverrun. Roose once again swears fealty to the Iron Throne and is granted the title of the Warden of the North. This event comes to be known as the "Red Wedding".

Legacy 
House Lannister strips House Stark of all lands and titles after Robb's failed rebellion against the Iron Throne. The Boltons recapture Winterfell from Theon, expel the Ironborn from the North, and begin to rule with an iron fist. Sansa is forced to marry Roose's legitimized bastard, Ramsay Bolton. Tywin and Roose are both killed by their own sons. The remnants of Robb's army, now led by Brynden Tully, recapture Riverrun and hold it until Jaime Lannister retakes it and Brynden is killed. Arya Stark returns to Westeros, murders Walder Frey and his sons, and poisons all of his male descendants, ultimately exterminating House Frey. Sansa escapes from the Boltons and she and Jon Snow successfully destroy House Bolton and retake Winterfell. Jon is crowned the King in the North, restoring Stark rule in the process. With the arrival of Queen Daenerys Targaryen, Jon declares fealty and becomes Warden of the North. However, following her death and Jon's banishment, the North is given permission by the newly appointed King Bran Stark to regain its independence, and the Northern lords declare Sansa the Queen in the North.

In other media
In his article "The War in Westeros and Just War Theory", Richard H. Corrigan uses Robb to illustrate the concepts of just cause and right intention in the decision to go to war: "Robb is not only fighting this war to ensure that his fellow Northerners have a just king [Robb's cause].  He is also doing it to avenge his father, Ned, and to recover his sisters Arya and Sansa [Robb's intention]." Corrigan speculates that Robb may be suffering from cognitive dissonance and says that, ethically, once Robb has achieved his cause, he is obligated to cease fighting even if he has not yet avenged his family.

Robb's decision to renege on his promise to marry one of Walder Frey's daughters features heavily in the fifth chapter of Tim Phillips and Rebecca Clare's Game of Thrones and Business, "Keep Your Word: Robb Stark discovers too late the dangers of broken promises in business deals."

Family tree of House Stark 

Rickard Stark

References 

A Song of Ice and Fire characters
Fiction about regicide
Fictional murdered people
Literary characters introduced in 1996
Fictional generals
Fictional characters who can morph animal or plant forms
Fictional kings
Fictional lords and ladies
Fictional outlaws
Fictional revolutionaries
Fictional swordfighters
Fictional military strategists
Male characters in literature
Male characters in television
Television characters introduced in 2011